The 1925 Kentucky Wildcats football team was an American football team that represented the University of Kentucky as a member of the Southern Conference (SoCon) during the 1925 season. In its second season under head coach Fred J. Murphy, Kentucky compiled an overall record of 6–3 with a mark of 4–2 against conference opponents, finished seventh in the SoCon, and was outscored by a total of 97 to 92. The team played its home games at Stoll Field in Lexington, Kentucky.

Schedule

References

Kentucky
Kentucky Wildcats football seasons
Kentucky Wildcats football